"The Story of My Life" is a song written by Burt Bacharach and Hal David. It was published in 1957. It was recorded by Marty Robbins and it reached number one on Billboards country chart in 1958, and it became a number one hit song for Michael Holliday in the UK.

Background
"The Story of My Life" was the first successful collaboration between Hal David and Burt Bacharach. Although they did not set out to write a country song, their song was recorded by American country music singer Marty Robbins. Robbins was accompanied in the recording by the whistling of Ray Conniff Singers and a small-scale guitar. The song was released in November 1957 and peaked at number one on two US country charts (C&W Best Sellers in Stores and Most Played C&W by Jockeys), staying for four weeks on Best Sellers in early 1958. It also crossed over to the pop chart, reaching number fifteen. It reached number two on Australian Singles Chart.

Charts

Michael Holliday version
In the United Kingdom, Michael Holliday recorded a cover version on 10 December 1957 at the Abbey Road Studio. Holliday was backed by the Mike Sammes Singers, with Sammes singing the deep-voiced "bom-boms". The sound engineer created an echo effect with a second tape head, producing a fuller sound to Holliday's voice. Although Holliday was dissatisfied with the record, it became his first No. 1 in the UK Singles Chart in February 1958. The song was replaced as No. 1 by Perry Como's "Magic Moments", also written by Bacharach and David, the first time any songwriters had consecutive No. 1s on the British chart.

In addition to Michael Holliday's No. 1 single (Parlophone 45-DB-4058), three other versions of "The Story of My Life" were released in the UK around the same time in 1958: Gary Miller recorded a version that reached No. 14 in the UK; a version by Alma Cogan reached No. 25; and a single by Dave King reached No. 20.

Other versions
 A pop-rock version by Herman's Hermits was included on the US compilation LP The Best Of Herman's Hermits - Volume II, released in 1966.
Connie Francis recorded the song in 1968 for possible inclusion in her album Connie Francis Sings Bacharach & David, but it was omitted. The track was later released in 1979 on the album titled Connie Francis – Sings Bacharach, Kaempfert, Last & Mancini.
Billy J. Kramer also recorded a version of "The Story of My Life" on his 2013 CD titled, "I Won the Fight". 
It was also recorded by television presenter, Terry Wogan.
Jim Reeves performed the song in 1957, during one of his hour radio shows broadcasting live on WSM (AM) from The National Insurance Building in Nashville Tennessee. Performing with the Anita Kerr singers, he managed to forget the lyrics mid-song. Humorously requesting his music from announcer David Cobb, he recovered for the last refrain. These recordings were released in 2008 on "I'm a Hit Again".
Don Williams had "The Story Of My Life" on his 1983 Yellow Moon album.
Larry Cunningham recorded a version which reached No. 16 on the Irish chart in 1983.
Irish singer Val Doonican also recorded the song, which became his signature theme. He titled his 2009 autobiography "My Story, My Life", in reference to the song title.

References

1957 singles
1958 singles
Marty Robbins songs
Connie Francis songs
Don Williams songs
Songs with lyrics by Hal David
Songs with music by Burt Bacharach
UK Singles Chart number-one singles
1957 songs